Swamp Thing is the third album by Malcolm McLaren, released in 1985. It is composed of out-takes recorded between 1982 and 1984. The tracks were often built upon material previously recorded - for example, "Eiffel Tower" repurposed lyrics from the Bow Wow Wow song "Sexy Eiffel Towers" with the rhythm track of "Punk it Up" from McLaren's album Duck Rock, while another track from that album, "Soweto," found its instrumental hook reused in the track "Boom Boom Baby."

The album was released to fulfill a contractual obligation with his record label. "Duck Rock Cheer" was the sole single released to promote the album. Neither the album nor the single met with commercial or critical success, though "Eiffel Tower" had earlier been featured on the soundtrack to the 1984 Jerry Schatzberg film No Small Affair.

Critical reception
NME wrote that the album "plays listlessly end to end," and but that there are "four goodies out of eight." Trouser Press wrote that "the title track perverts 'Wild Thing' into a nightmarish but enjoyable mess." The Rolling Stone Album Guide called Swamp Thing "a hellishly self-referential mess."

Track listing

Bonus tracks
 "Duck Rock Cheer - 12" Version (Cheerleader Version)"
 "Duck Rock Cheer - 7" Vocal Edit"
 "First Couple Out"
 "First Couple Out - Extended Version"
 "First Couple Out - Long fade"
 "B.1. Bikki - (New Mix, 2019)"

Personnel
 Stephen Hague - Production (tracks 2 and 5)
 Trevor Horn - Production (tracks 2 and 8)
 Malcolm McLaren - Production (all tracks except 2 and 5)
 Nick Egan - Cover Design
 Michael Halsband - Photography
 Bob Gruen - Background Photography

References

Malcolm McLaren albums
Albums produced by Stephen Hague
Albums produced by Trevor Horn
1985 compilation albums
Charisma Records compilation albums
Island Records compilation albums